Brighton & Hove Albion Women Football Club is an English women's football club affiliated with Brighton & Hove Albion. The club currently compete in the Women's Super League and the first team play at the Broadfield Stadium, home of Crawley Town F.C.

History
In their original guise as Brighton GPO, the club reached the semi-final of the FA Women's Cup in 1975–76. In 1990 they linked up with the men's club and became founder members of the Premier League in 1991–92, in Division 1 South.

Before it was departed, the club played three matches at the Goldstone Ground, the old home of Brighton's men's side, against Milton Keynes, Horsham and Whitehawk.

In 2015, the club set a five-year plan to reach the FA WSL 1 and UEFA Women's Champions League qualification. That season they missed promotion to the FA WSL 2 though by finishing runners-up to Portsmouth. In 2015–16 they won the Southern Division and the following play-off against Northern Champions Sporting Club Albion. Following the play-off victory, their promotion to the FA WSL 2 was confirmed.

The team joined the FA WSL 1, the top tier of women's football in England, for the 2018–19 season having had their application to join the restructured league approved. During the day of the announcement of the promotion, the club also revealed they would relocate to Crawley Town's Broadfield Stadium for first team matches.

Women's Super League (2018-present)

Albion's first season in the Barclays FA Women's Super League saw them finish ninth in what was then an 11 team league, finishing 19 points clear of relegated Yeovil Town. Hope Powell's team secured four wins from their 20 league matches, while Ellie Brazil finished as top scorer with four goals. Their first WSL win came in a 2-1 home win over Yeovil Town, with Jodie Brett and Victoria Williams getting on the scoresheet.

The 2019/20 season was curtailed with four games left to play due to the outbreak of the Covid-19, with Albion again finishing in ninth place in the WSL. Aileen Whelan finished as top scorer that campaign with five league goals, while Albion drew in their second league game of the season against Chelsea - just one of three sides who took a point off the eventual champions.

Powell would lead her side to their highest placed finish in the WSL in the 2020/21 season, finishing in sixth place. An opening day victory against Birmingham City marked one of just two victories Albion enjoyed in the league until February, before going on an incredible run that saw them win six of their last nine matches. That rich vein of form included a 2-1 victory over Chelsea, that ended the Blues' run of 33 matches unbeaten in league football. Summer signing Inessa Kaagman finished as top scorer with nine goals in all competitions, as they also recorded notable victories over Tottenham Hotspur and Manchester United.

Managerial history

Former players
For details of current and former players with a Wikipedia article, see :Category:Brighton & Hove Albion W.F.C. players.

Players and staff

Current squad

Coaching staff

See also
 Football in Sussex

References

External links

Official website

 
Women's football clubs in England
Brighton & Hove Albion F.C.
Sport in Brighton and Hove
Association football clubs established in 1991
1991 establishments in England
Women's Championship (England) teams
FA Women's National League teams
Works association football teams in England